Quadrate may refer to:

 Quadrate bone
 Quadrate (heraldry)
 Quadrate lobe of liver
 Quadrate tubercle of femur

See also
Quadrat (disambiguation)